Taz is a dialect of Northeastern Mandarin formerly spoken by the Taz people of the Russian Far East. There are a few loanwords from Tungusic languages, but no obvious Tungusic effect on the grammar. 

Taz is not a distinct language. In 1992, some Chinese bought ginseng from the Taz. They spoke Standard Chinese and Taz, respectively, and could understand one other. What they did not understand were mainly place names and social terms.

History
The Taz are descendants of the intermarriage of Han Chinese immigrants and local Tungusic peoples. In the early to middle 19th century, Han Chinese from Northeast China moved to the Ussuri River basin and engaged in ginseng harvesting, fishing and hunting. The immigrants were mostly men, and they married the local Udege and Nanai peoples. Their language, while remaining completely Chinese grammatically, adopted some loan words from Nanai and Udege. There is a 400-word dictionary, but the language otherwise has no writing system and is a purely oral language. In 1880, the language was used by a thousand people. By the beginning of the 21st century, only a few elderly people still spoke it. The 2002 All-Russian Census recorded that all Taz people regarded Russian as their mother tongue. The 2010 census found 274 Taz people but no Taz speakers, so the Taz language is likely to be extinct.

Phonology
Taz is a typical Northeastern Mandarin dialect. There is no retroflex series, but there is erhua. Words with an r initial of Standard Chinese (MSC) have an initial y in Taz, and some words with an initial f in MSC have an initial h in Taz. The MSC finals -ai and -ou are pronounced -ei and -u in Taz, whereas nasal finals are mostly realized as nasal vowels. Taz has the four lexical tones and the neutral tone of MSC and Northeast Mandarin. The yin ping tone (tone 1) is lower than in MSC, and yang ping (tone 2) 为降升调. The distinction between yang ping and shang tone (tone 3) is not obvious. The pitch drops at the end of a sentence, and can sound like a shang or qu tone.

Vocabulary
The vocabulary is typical of Northeastern Mandarin, with such characteristic words as 俺們 for 'we', дэй3фань4 dei3fan4 for 'food' and 日頭 for 'sun'. There are a few loanwords from Tungusic languages, such as араки ar'aki 'wine', яцзига yajiga 'daughter' (Udege ajiga), etc. Исима yixima 'rainbow trout' may be from Oroch.

Sample texts
Listed below are some Taz sentences. They are transcribed in standard Russian Cyrillicized Chinese.

References

Bibliography

 Belikov, Vladimir and Elena Perexval’skaja. 1994. "Tazov jazyk [The language of the Taz]", in Vladimir Neroznak (ed.) Krasnaja kniga jazykov narodov Rossii.  Enciklopedičeskij slovar’-spravočnik [The Red Book of languages of Russia. Encyclopedic dictionary]. Moscow: Academia, 50–51.

Languages of Russia
Mandarin Chinese